Rafael Geronimo Barretto y Soler (September 30, 1931 – December 25, 1999) was a Filipino basketball player who competed in the 1956 Summer Olympics.

References

External links
 

1931 births
1999 deaths
Basketball players from Manila
Olympic basketball players of the Philippines
Basketball players at the 1956 Summer Olympics
Philippines men's national basketball team players
Filipino men's basketball players
Filipino emigrants to Australia
1954 FIBA World Championship players